Diane Joyce Austin-Broos  (born 1946) is an anthropologist from Australia.  She is a Professor Emeritus at the University of Sydney; her major research areas are Jamaica and Central Australia.

Early life and education 
Austin-Broos was born in Melbourne in 1946, and attended Hartwell State School and the Methodist Ladies' College in Kew.  She won a scholarship to the Australian National University, where she studied philosophy and oriental studies. She also complete a master's degree in philosophy, followed by a short time in a research position for Professor Henry Mayer at the University of Sydney. In 1969 she won a scholarship to the University of Chicago and completed a doctorate in anthropology there in 1974. Austin-Broos returned to Australia the same year.

Career 
Austin-Broos lectured in the Department of Anthropology and Sociology at Monash University in Melbourne for over five years; in 1980 moved to a position in anthropology at the University of Sydney. She became an associate professor in 1985 and a professor in 1995, a position she held until her retirement in 2008. She was then appointed professor emerita.

While teaching at the University of Sydney, Austin-Broos introduced two major courses, on social change and the history of anthropological thought, to the anthropology curriculum. She also led a redesign of the first year course and supervised doctoral theses on a wide range of topics.

Austin-Broos is an elected fellow of the Academy of the Social Sciences in Australia (1990) and a past president of the Australian Anthropological Society and the Australian Caribbean Scholars Association. Her 2011 book A Different Inequality was a finalist in the Australian Human Rights Commission’s Human Rights Award for Literature (non-fiction). She is a fellow of the Royal Society of New South Wales (FRSN).

Publications 

 Jamaica Genesis: Religion and the Politics of Moral Orders, (1997) The University of Chicago Press 
 Arrernte Present, Arrernte Past: Invasion, Violence, and Imagination in Indigenous Central Australia, (2009) The University of Chicago Press 
 A Different Inequality: The Politics of Debate About Remote Aboriginal Australia (2011) Allen & Unwin

References

1946 births
Living people
People educated at Methodist Ladies' College, Melbourne
Australian anthropologists
Australian women anthropologists
Australian ethnologists
Australian National University alumni
University of Chicago alumni
Academic staff of Monash University
Academic staff of the University of Sydney
Academics from Melbourne
Fellows of the Royal Society of New South Wales
Date of birth missing (living people)
Fellows of the Academy of the Social Sciences in Australia